The Riverview Historic District is an  historic district in Selma, Dallas County, Alabama.  It is bounded by Selma Avenue, Satterfield and Lapsley streets, and the Alabama River.  The district includes examples of the Tudor Revival, Colonial Revival, American Craftsman, and several Queen Anne styles (Stick, Eastlake, and Shingle).  Primarily residential, it contains 204 contributing properties and  54 noncontributing properties. The district is representative of the prosperity of people in the city at the turn of the 20th century. This time marked a  period of major growth for the middle and working-class population.  The district was added to the National Register of Historic Places on June 28, 1990.

References

American middle class
National Register of Historic Places in Dallas County, Alabama
Historic districts in Dallas County, Alabama
Historic districts on the National Register of Historic Places in Alabama
Working-class culture in the United States